{{speciesbox
|image = Tiquilia nuttallii (4031389657).jpg
|image_caption = Tiquilia nuttallii
|status = G5
|status_system = TNC
|status_ref =
|genus = Tiquilia
|species = nuttallii|authority = (Hook.) A.T. Richardson
|synonyms = Coldenia nuttallii}}Tiquilia nuttallii'' (Nuttall's crinklemat, annual tiquilia, Nuttall sandmat, Nuttall's coldenia) is an annual, subshrub-like plant of middle and higher elevation deserts in the family Boraginaceae - borages or the forget-me-nots. It is found in western North America from central Washington to western Colorado, and northern California and northern Arizona; it is also found in a disjunct population in Missouri.

It is a short, low-growing plant, seldom over 4 to 12 in tall. Flowers are 5-lobed. Leaves are small with ridges, hence the name crinklemat.

References

External links
Images from the CalPhotos archive
Calflora Database: Tiquilia nuttallii (Nuttall's coldenia,  Nuttall's crinklemat)
Jepson eFlora (TJM2): Tiquilia nuttallii
Photo
"Desert Wildflowers in a Very Dry Year"

nuttallii
Flora of California
Flora of the Great Basin
Flora of the Northwestern United States
Flora of the Southwestern United States
Flora of the California desert regions
Flora of the Sierra Nevada (United States)
Natural history of the Mojave Desert
Least concern plants